Marc Séguin (born March 20, 1970) is a French Canadian painter and novelist whose work is held in several important collections.

Life
Marc Séguin was born in Ottawa, Ontario on March 20, 1970. He studied at Concordia University, where he obtained a bachelor's degree in Fine Arts. He writes, paints and makes prints.
Recurrent themes in his writings and visual works include destruction, terrorism, the papacy, dictatorship and serial killers. One of his more macabre concepts has been to make paintings using human ashes. He is the father of four children, and divides his time between his organic farm in Hemmingford, Quebec, and his studio in Brooklyn, New York. A documentary film has been made of his life in Hemmingford.

Exhibitions and collections
Séguin's first solo exhibition in 1996 was well received.
In 1997 the Musée d'art contemporain de Montréal invited him to participate in the group exhibit De fougue et de passion, and in 2000 invited him to hold a personal exhibition of large paintings based on medieval rose windows. In the summer of 2001 this exhibition was shown at the Canadian Cultural Center in Paris.
It toured Canada in 2003-04.
Séguin has exhibited at the Musée d'art contemporain de Baie-Saint-Paul twice, in 2001 and 2013.
The Musée d’art contemporain de Montréal, the Montreal Museum of Fine Arts and the Musée national des beaux-arts du Québec have all acquired his works, as have many corporate and individual collectors. Séguin has participated in many group exhibitions in North America and Europe.

Novels
 La Foi du braconnier, éditions Leméac, 2009
 Hollywood, éditions Leméac, 2012 (Finalist in the 2013 Governor General's Awards)
 Nord Alice, éditions Leméac, 2015

Film
 Stealing Alice, 2016

References

Sources

1970 births
Living people
Canadian painters
Canadian male novelists
21st-century Canadian novelists
Writers from Ottawa
Artists from Ottawa
Franco-Ontarian people
Canadian novelists in French
21st-century Canadian male writers